S.S. Lazio finished 12th in its first Serie B season, staying in the league for another season.

Squad

Goalkeepers
  Mario Ielpo
  Astutillo Malgioglio
  Gianluca Carlini

Defenders
  Fabio Calcaterra
  Ernesto Calisti
  Daniele Filisetti
  Roberto Galbiati
  Massimo Piscedda
  Gabriele Podavini
  Arcadio Spinozzi

Midfielders
  Batista
  Domenico Caso
  Giuseppe Corti
  Vincenzo D'Amico
  Francesco Dell'Anno
  Francesco Fonte
  Giorgio Magnocavallo
  Fortunato Torrisi
  Alessandro Tosi
  Claudio Vinazzani

Attackers
  Oscar Damiani
  Giuliano Fiorini
  Oliviero Garlini
  Antonio Piconi
  Fabio Poli

Competitions

Serie B

League table

S.S. Lazio seasons
Lazio